The Reason is the second studio album by Eleven22. They released the album on May 15, 2012.

Critical reception

Awarding the album three and a half stars at New Release Today, Kevin Davis writes, "[the listener will be] refreshed, nourished, encouraged, and turn to God for your strength." Tony Cummings, rating the album a perfect ten for Cross Rhythms, describes, "...this is one of the finest albums of modern worship". Indicating in a three and a half review from The Phantom Tollbooth, Derek Walker says, "Extremely well-executed praise music that pays tribute to a life that impacted many, and benefits orphanages around the world." Andrew Funderburk, giving the album three and a half stars by CM Addict, states, "Despite what may seem like flaws in my eyes, this project sends out a deeper strain of beauty because of what The Reason stands for."

Track listing

References

2012 albums